Alexandre Alexandrovitch Alexeieff (Russian: Александр Александрович Алексеев; 18 April 1901 – 9 August 1982) was a Russian Empire-born artist, filmmaker and illustrator who lived and worked mainly in Paris. He and his second wife Claire Parker (1906–1981) are credited with inventing the pinscreen as well as the animation technique totalization. In all Alexeieff produced 6 films on the pinscreen, 41 advertising films and illustrated 41 books.

Early life 
Alexeieff was born in the town of Kazan in Russia. He spent his early childhood in Istanbul where his father, Alexei Alexeieff, was a military attaché.

Alexeieff had two older brothers, Vladimir and Nikolai. Vladimir caught syphilis from a Moscow actress with whom he had an affair. His mother forced him to remain in his room and not touch his brothers. The pressure of this was such that Vladimir shot himself. Before he died, he wrote a note to Alexandre saying, "You are very talented. You must keep on drawing". His second brother, Nikolai, disappeared in Georgia, Russia, during the Russian Revolution of 1917. He was never heard from again; the family suspected that he died of typhus.
  
In his unpublished memoir Oublis ou Regrets, Alexeieff wrote that he rarely saw his father due to the fact that he was often away on missions. He took a daily walk with his mother when he was forced to speak in French instead of Russian. The rest of the time he was under the care of a nanny. Alexieff's father died mysteriously in Baden-Baden, Germany on an official trip at the age of 37. He was shot by a Turk, probably because he knew too much about the Middle East. His mother traveled to Germany without telling the children where she was going or why and only when she returned did Alexeieff learn that his father had died.

After the death of his father
In his memoirs, Alexeieff describes the tribulations his mother went through after the death of her husband. She first went to stay with her brother-in-law near Odessa, then she went to Riga and finally settled in the town of Gatchina, Russia near Saint Petersburg.

While in Riga, Alexeieff saw a film for the very first time. This made a big impression on the boy. He was surprised to find that the image which was projected on the screen could be seen reflected in the lens of the projector, which happened to be close to where he was sitting. He later realized that the image on the lens was the original one.

When he was seven years old, he was dragged through various government offices by his mother to wait in line in order for the widow to collect the meager pension which had been allotted to her. ”Wait for me here, be a good boy, I shall be back!” she said as she asked the boy to sit and wait on a chair. When she left the room where her son was, he feared as the door closed behind her that she might never return! A boy he knew once told him, ”My mother left too, she never came back!”

In Gatchina, Alexandre often walked alone along the wooden fences of the road nearby. He often called to his brothers who were playing on the other side and said, "Mama died you know... We will have to be kept in school from now on!” He realized later that his mother had sacrificed herself for her sons. However, his mother did return and Alexeieff's family settled in Gatchin, a suburb of St. Petersburg and later moved to nearby Lesnoi.

Cadet Corps School
Alexeieff entered the Cadet School of Saint Petersburg at the age of seven. His favorite course was drawing. His art teacher taught the students how to draw from memory. He would pass various objects, such as a violin, through the class, remove it and ask the students to draw it. This early training became extremely valuable for Alexeieff later on in life when he became an illustrator. The teacher would also ask them to portray events such as dance or a holiday feast, or read them text and have the students illustrate it, a task Alexeieff particularly enjoyed.

While in the Cadet School, Alexeieff founded a literary magazine which contained works created by students. His friends did not take this project seriously. However, Alexeieff was able to petition for funds and also obtain access to the library which was very valuable to him.

His older brother Vladimir was also a student at the Cadet school. They rarely met but their names were engraved on the wall of the school for having been the best students in their class. Nikolay, who was deaf in one ear, never attended the academy with his brothers.

When the Russian Revolution of 1917 began with general strikes in St. Petersburg, school was closed for three days and Alexeieff returned home to Lesnoi by train. However his brothers Nikolai and Vladimir had not returned and his mother was in a state of panic. Eventually, his brothers did return having been caught as bystanders in a fight between the police and revolutionaries. Shortly thereafter, he received word that Tsar Nicholas the Second had been arrested and abdicated. When Alexeieff was in his teens, he was attracted to communism. However, the arrest and execution of his mother's brother by the Bolsheviks led him to rethink his position.

In 1921, Alexeieff was forced to leave the city of Ufa where he had spent the summer with his maternal uncle in order to cross Siberia with a group of cadets. They landed in Vladivostok, where they took the last boat of the Tsar which was in the harbor. The boat went to Egypt where it was purchased by the British who kept the crew in order to transport coal from Southampton to Cairo. During one of the crossings, a storm forced them to anchor in the French Riviera where Alexeieff jumped ship holding on to a letter of recommendation to the Russian set designer Sergei Soudeikin who was living in Paris.  Alexeieff started by working designing and painting sets for the Pioteff Theater. He lived in Montparnasse, a bohemian area of Paris.

Life in Paris
In 1923, he married Alexandra Alexandrovna Grinevskya (1899–1976), who had been sent to Paris in her childhood because she was the illegitimate daughter of a St. Petersburg dignitary. In order to save the name of his aristocratic family, Alexandra's father had not married the mother of his child. Instead, the baby was taken away from her mother at the age of two and adopted by her father's sister Katia who kept a musical salon in Paris. Her mother was given a ticket back to Poland, her native country.

When she grew up, Grinevskaya left her aunt to become one of the main actresses in the avant-garde Pitoeff Theater. When Konstantin Stanislavski came to Paris and saw her acting, he offered to have her go back to Russia but Alexandra refused, remaining by Alexeieff's side. Their daughter Svetlana was born in 1923.

Alexeieff became well known in this period shortly after illustrating his first rare books. However, he lost one of his lungs while using nitric acid to do his aquatints and was forced to spend two years in a sanatorium. During that time Grinevsky-Alexeieff took his tools and taught herself how to engrave and became the bread winner for the family. While the invention of the pinscreen is often credited to Claire Parker and Alexeieff, Grinevsky-Alexeieff was the first to help Alexeieff build the pinscreen, with the help of her eight-year-old daughter.

Parker and Alexeieff
Claire Parker (1910–1981), a well-to-do American art student and graduate of MIT came to France in 1931 to study art. She saw Alexieff's work in a bookshop window and got the name of the artist as well as his address from the owner of the bookstore. She was so impressed she arranged to meet him and came to Vaux-le Penail where the Alexeieffs lived. She recalled later, "I figured I would meet an old, dignified man with a white beard... but [instead] I saw this tall, brown, handsome, aristocratic 30-year-old guy. Our first lesson ended on the banks of the Seine, hand in hand; and there was never a second one.".

Alexeieff and his wife agreed to take Claire as a boarder and as a student. After a few months, Claire became Alexeieff's lover. Grinevsky accepted the situation with difficulty. They moved to Paris and rented several artist studios on The Left Bank. They collaborated on various projects. When they started to make films, Claire became the camera person and Grinevsky built and painted the props and sets for the films. However, after the first large pin screen was built, Parker and Alexeieff worked on it alone.

Alexeieff, Parker and Grinevskaya made about 25 stop motion-animated commercials to sustain themselves financially, though they reportedly did not see much difference between their "artistic" and "commercial" films. At times, when making traditional animated films and commercials they also had a fourth partner, animator Etienne Raik. Although most of the commercial and art films are credited to Alexeieff and Parker, it is difficult to separate the contributions of each of the individuals who had formed Alexeieff's team. The group included Alexandra Grinevsky, Etienne Raik, Pierre Gorodich and Georges Violet.

Both Grinevsky and Parker greatly contributed to the success of the films. Alexandra was more critical and had a sharper eye, Claire had better technical and mathematical skills. She was more patient with Alexeieff and praised him frequently while Grinevsky looked the other way Claire was quoted by her biographer as saying, “"Between us, he's the genius."

After building the first large pinscreen, Alexeieff and Parker began work on the first pinscreen film in 1931, Night on Bald Mountain, an adaptation of the piece by Modest Mussorgsky, his favorite Russian composer. The theme of Mussorgsky's composition and the film is a witches' Sabbath on the summer solstice on Mount Triglav near Kiev, Russia. However the film is less narrative and more poetic, a succession of images rather than a story. The film took the couple two years to make.

The technique of the pinscreen made it impossible to erase any of the images that had been shot after having drawn them.  Once an image was shot, it was impossible to correct it. One had to wait until the film was back from the laboratory. Therefore, two years of work had been conceived in the dark so to speak. Adding to the impermanence of the pinscreen itself, Alexeieff made no sketches for the film, composing each shot in his head and filming them immediately.

The reception at the Pantheon Theater in Paris was extremely encouraging. Newspaper articles were positive, artists and film critics felt that the team had succeeded in creating a more serious type of animation, moving away from cartoons. However, it soon became apparent that working on the pinscreen was time-consuming and therefore costly to use. Consequently, major studios never offered to use the pinscreen with the exception of the National Film Board of Canada.

In 1936, Alexeieff was hired by a German film group in Berlin to lead an animation studio. He made a few animated films for German products and returned to Paris right before the Anschluss, the German annexation of Austria. When the Germans invaded the Netherlands and Belgium in 1940, Alexeieff expected to have German film producers come and ask him make propaganda films which he would have refused to do. Therefore, he packed their old Ford automobile and the family fled south in order to pick up visas at the US Embassy in Bordeaux.

Alexeieff divorced Alexandra Grinevsky and married Claire Parker in 1940 after they arrived in the States. Alexandra and Svetlana lived separately. In 1943, they moved to Canada and produced their second pinscreen film, In Passing (En passant), with funding from the National Film Board of Canada. It was released in 1944. The four returned to France in 1946.

Later life
When Parker and Alexeieff returned to Paris, they made a number of advertising films. Alexeieff invented a technique called Totalization of Illusory Solids or simply Totalization. This process involves filming a moving object at long exposures to capture the trace of the path of motion. The resulting image gives the appearance of a solid object. For example, the path of a pendulum filmed in this fashion would appear to be a solid semicircle. This technique gave their advertisements a unique look.

Alexeieff and Parker also continued to make films using the pin screen. In 1962, they used it to make the prologue to Orson Welles' film adaptation of Franz Kafka's novel The Trial. This marks the only mainstream, widely distributed film that Alexeieff and Parker were involved with. The pin-screen was not animated for this sequence. Instead still shots were filmed while Orson Welles read Kafka's parable "Before the Law" over it.

The Nose, based on Nikolai Gogol's satirical short story was released in 1963 and marks the first narrative film made on the pinscreen. The film tells the story of a Russian official who loses his nose and the adventures of the nose itself as well as the barber who finds the nose.

On 7 August 1972, Alexeieff and Parker were invited back to Canada in order to demonstrate the pinscreen to a group of animators at the National Film Board of Canada. This demonstration was filmed, and released by the NFB as Pin Screen. This film appears on disk 7 of Norman McLaren: The Master's Edition, along with Pinscreen Tests (1961).

In the same year, they also released another film again, based on Mussorgsky's Pictures at an Exhibition. This film used two pinscreens. In front of the main pinscreen, they installed a second, smaller one. This second pinscreen could be rotated thus giving more of an illusion of three-dimensionality. However, the film was never completed.
 
Their last film, Three Moods (Trois thèmes), was made on the pinscreen, and first shown in Milan, Italy, in March 1980. It was based on three works by Mussorgsky.

Parker died in 1981, in Paris and Alexeieff followed Claire by a year. The two are buried in Nice France. He and Parker left no children.

Although Alexeieff and Parker strove to create serious works of art and shunned any commercialization in their films (excluding their paid work doing advertisements, of course), when asked what her favorite films were, Parker answered "The ones with Tom Mix and his beautiful white horse!"

The pinscreen
Alexeieff is most famous for his invention of the pinscreen which he used to make about 6 short films.

The pinboard on which Alexeieff created his extraordinary black and white films is an upright perforated board, three by four feet, into which a million headless steel pins have been inserted. When the pins are pushed forward and lighted obliquely, they create an entirely black surface on the front of the Pinboard. When they are pushed back, the white of the board shows through. In between the pins create various shades of grey.

The first prototype of the pinscreen was made by Alexandra Grinevsky with the help of her daughter Svetlana. It consisted of a canvas perforated with a grid into which pins were inserted. Later on Claire Parker and Alexeieff built the first large pinscreen which was used to film Night on Bald Mountain. The Parker family paid for the construction of it.

Alexeieff never made sketches before he created the images on the screen. He conceived each of the stages on the positive side of the screen while Claire worked on the back side of it. Small man made tools were used to produce various patterns on the board. Such everyday instruments as forks, spoons, knives, brushes, cups, prisms and rolling pins were used.

Each of the frames was created one at a time. This painstaking technique demands a lot of attention and ingenuity.

The only follower of Alexeieff, Jacques Drouin, of the Canadian Film Board has made several films using this technique.

Legacy
Svetlana Rockwell (née Alexeieff) is an artist who uses pastels and acrylics. She has written her memoirs which describe accurately her family's background. Her son, Alexandre Rockwell is an independent film maker in the United States. Alexandre acknowledged the influence his grandfather had on his work, writing in his contribution to Itineraire d’un Maitre that "I can safely say there has been no greater influence in my life, and in that I know I am not alone." Itineraire d’un Maitre consists of essays by Yuri Norstein, Nikolay Izvolov, Oleg Kovalov, Georges Nivat, Claudine Eizykman, Guy Fihman, Dominique Willoughby, Svetlana Alexeieff-Rockwell as well as Alexandre Rockwell.

Filmography

Artistic Films

Advertisements

Documentaries about Alexeieff 
Alexeieff at the Pinboard (1960) – documentary filmed in their Paris studio
 Portrait of Alexeieff (1971) – documentary by Maurice Debeze.
Pin Screen (1972) – documentary of a pinscreen demonstration at the National Film Board of Canada
Dreams about Alfeoni (2002) - documentary by Vladimir Nepevny

Books illustrated by Alexeieff 

 Guillaume Apollinaire, Les Épingles, Éditions des Cahiers libres, 1928
 Léon-Paul Fargue, Poëmes, Librairie Gallimard NRF, 1931

Bibliography

References

External links

Review of the book Alexeieff: Itinerary of a Master
The Animation of Alexeieff 
The Animation of Alexeieff DVD North American release
The Unique Pinscreen Animation of Alexandre Alexeieff & Claire Parker 
Svetlana Rockwell's Site
Guide to Alexandre Alexeieff and Claire Parker correspondence with Cecile Starr at Houghton Library, Harvard University

Inventors from the Russian Empire
Alexandre Alexeieff and Claire Parker
White Russian emigrants to France
Alexandre Alexeieff and Claire Parker
Russian animators
Russian animated film directors
French animated film directors
Russian animated film producers
French animated film producers
Artists from the Russian Empire
French illustrators
1901 births
1982 deaths
Pinscreen animation
Russian Christians
Emigrants from the Russian Empire to France
20th-century Russian artists
20th-century French inventors